Moshe Schweitzer (born 24 April 1954) is an Israeli former footballer. He competed in the men's tournament at the 1976 Summer Olympics.

References

External links
 
 

1954 births
Living people
Israeli footballers
Israel international footballers
Olympic footballers of Israel
Footballers at the 1976 Summer Olympics
Place of birth missing (living people)
Association football midfielders
Maccabi Tel Aviv F.C. players
Hapoel Petah Tikva F.C. players
Hapoel Lod F.C. players
Hapoel Ramat Gan F.C. players